Frederik Frison (born 28 July 1992) is a Belgian professional road cyclist, who currently rides for UCI WorldTeam . He rode first for the  team, where he had some success in the first part of the 2015 season. He was then signed to the senior team as a stagiaire; he rode races including the 2015 Tour of Britain and the 2015 Paris–Tours. In May 2018, he was named in the startlist for the 2018 Giro d'Italia. In August 2020, he was named in the startlist for the 2020 Tour de France.

Personal life
He is related through his father to former professional cyclist Herman Frison, who is his great uncle.

Major results

2009
 6th Overall Sint–Martinusprijs Kontich
1st Stage 4
2010
 1st  Time trial, National Junior Road Championships
 2nd Kuurne–Brussels–Kuurne Juniores
2012
 2nd Time trial, National Under-23 Road Championships
2013
 National Under-23 Road Championships
2nd Time trial
3rd Road race
 7th Chrono Champenois
2014
 8th Chrono Champenois
 9th Time trial, UCI Under-23 Road World Championships
2015
 9th Overall Olympia's Tour
 9th Memorial Van Coningsloo
 10th Overall Tour du Loir-et-Cher
2017
 7th Le Samyn
2018
 3rd Primus Classic
 3rd Dwars door West–Vlaanderen
 5th Time trial, National Road Championships
2019
 5th Time trial, National Road Championships
2020
 3rd Time trial, National Road Championships
2022
 5th Time trial, National Road Championships

Grand Tour general classification results timeline

References

External links
 
 
 

1992 births
Living people
Belgian male cyclists
People from Geel
Cyclists from Antwerp Province
21st-century Belgian people